Lisa Raymond and Samantha Stosur defeated Elena Dementieva and Flavia Pennetta in the final, 6–2, 5–7, 6–3 to win the women's doubles tennis title at the 2005 US Open.

Virginia Ruano Pascual and Paola Suárez were the reigning champions, but Suárez withdrew due to a back injury. Ruano Pascual partnered Conchita Martínez, but lost in the semifinals to Raymond and Stosur.

Seeds

Draw

Finals

Top half

Section one

Section two

Bottom half

Section three

Section four

External links 
 Draw
2005 US Open – Women's draws and results at the International Tennis Federation

Women's Doubles
US Open (tennis) by year – Women's doubles
2005 in women's tennis
2005 in American women's sports